The scaly yellowfish, or KwaZulu-Natal yellowfish, (Labeobarbus natalensis) is a species of freshwater fish in the family Cyprinidae.

This fish is found in the Tugela River System in South Africa, as well as in the Umzimkulu, Umfolozi and the Mgeni. It is one of the most common fishes in KwaZulu-Natal Province and it lives in different habitats between the Drakensberg foothills and the coastal lowlands.
The species has been categorized as least concern (LC) on the IUCN Red List.

References 

Labeobarbus
Freshwater fish of South Africa
Taxa named by François-Louis Laporte, comte de Castelnau
Fish described in 1861